Avijit Singha Roy (born 20 February 1987) is an Indian cricketer. He made his List A debut for Assam in the 2018–19 Vijay Hazare Trophy on 9 October 2018.

References

External links
 

1987 births
Living people
Indian cricketers
Assam cricketers
Place of birth missing (living people)